Antoine Westermann is a French chef born in 1949 in the Alsatian town of Wissembourg, on the northeast border of France.

He held 3 Michelin Guide stars for his Strasbourg restaurant Le Buerehiesel and maintained a star rating at the restaurant for over 31 years until 2007, when he asked the Michelin Guide to remove them.

Biography

Early life 
Antoine Westermann decided to become a chef at age 8, encouraged by his father. He studied at L'Ecole Hôteliere in Strasbourg while apprenticing at the nearby Buffet de la Gare.

In 1969, after Westermann earned his professional diploma, his father took out a mortgage on the historic family home to purchase a small farmhouse in the middle of Strasbourg's Parc de l'Orangerie for Westermann, then 23, to turn into a restaurant. That spot became Le Buerehiesel, the Alsatian dialect meaning for "little farmhouse".

1969-2007: Le Buerehiesel 
Westermann remained head chef and proprietor of Le Buerehiesel for 38 years. Located in a traditional 17th-century Alsatian building, the restaurant earned its first Michelin star in 1975, followed by a second star in 1983.

1994 
In 1994, 25 years after its opening, Le Buerehiesel was awarded both a 3-star Michelin ranking and a 19/20 rating in the "Gault & Millau Guide" while Westermann was named one of France's top chefs along with Joël Robuchon, Michel Bras, Guy Savoy and Alain Ducasse.

1998-2006: Other Endeavors 
From 1998 to 2006 Westermann oversaw the kitchen operations at Fortaleza do Guincho in Cascais, Portugal, alongside executive chef Vincent Farges. The restaurant has retained one Michelin star since 2001.

2007 
In 2007, Westermann gave up his 3 stars to turn to new culinary adventures. His son, Eric Westermann took over Le Buerehiesel and won 1 Michelin star in 2008.

2003-2017: Mon Vieil Ami 
In homage to his mother's cuisine, Westermann opened the vegetable-centric bistro Mon Vieil Ami (meaning "My Old Friend") in 2003. The restaurant became the first table d'hôte in Paris, an otherwise traditional Alsatian format that ran until its closing in 2017.

2006-2018: Drouant 
In 2006, Westermann overtook operations at Paris's historic Drouant, where the deliberations for the Goncourt and Renaudot prizes have taken place since 1914. Westermann sold Drouant to restaurateurs Gardinier & Fils in 2018.

2012: Le Coq Rico 
From 2012 on, Westermann focused on his passion for poultry. He has since stated desire to develop his vision of eating meat well, believing that quality poultry must be farmed responsibly. By working hand-in-hand with local farmers and ensuring complete transparency in the sourcing process, Westermann hopes to expand the market for ethical meat production throughout France and the United States.

He created the brand and the first concept of a mono-maniac bistro around poultry, Le Coq Rico, in Paris. The restaurant is recognized as the best roasted chicken in Paris by several food critics.

On September 2021, Le Coq Rico became Le Coq & Fils - The Poultry House

2016-2018  
On the strength of this Parisian success, he developed his savoir-faire in New York and branded Le Coq Rico in financial association with Francis Staub. The success was immediate (2 stars at The New York Times, Best Roasted Poultry from NYC ) and advocates for small poultry farmers in NY.

In August 2018, he was suddenly dismissed from office by his partner.

From now on, he states a desire to deepen his work around poultry, strengthen his links with farmers, and gain, on his own scale, a sincere and complete traceability. He works hand in hand with farmers on the development of old breeds, such as the red turkey of the Ardennes, the Landes poultry, the poultry of Contre, the Naked Neck of Forez, La Flèche.

He shares his passion for poultry from all over France, with "Le tour de France des belles volailles" - a monthly event with an old breed in addition to the menu. He continues to develop his work in the United States where he is the ambassador of the Live Stock Conservancy, an organization that manages the reintroduction and enhancement of ancient American breeds.

Restaurants

France 

 1969-2007: Le Buerehiesel - 3 stars Michelin Guide in Strasbourg
 2003-2016: Mon Vieil Ami in Paris
 2006-2018: Drouant by Antoine Westermann in Paris
 2012 - Today: Le Coq & Fils, The Poultry House - formerly Le Coq Rico
 2013-2017: La Dégustation in Paris - an ode to the art of French appetizing in the Montmartre neighborhood of Paris.

United States 

 2002-2005: Restaurant Café 15 at the Sofitel Lafayette Square Hotel in Washington, D.C.
 2006-2013: Le Café du Parc - Pennsylvania Avenue in Washington, D.C.
 2016-2018: Le Coq Rico - New York

Portugal 
 1999-2016: Fortaleza do Guincho in Cascais
 2007-2012: Uva Restaurant at The Vine Hotel in Funchal

Cooking style 
Westermann's cooking style is anchored in his Alsatian identity, frequently reinventing traditional Alsatian recipes to create signature dishes such as "Beer Brioche", "Oyster Soup", and "Pâté en Croûte." Outside of Alsace, Westermann's style is heavily influenced by the Mediterranean cuisine of South-Eastern France. Westermann is a proponent of the ethical sourcing of meat, believing, "Omnivore oui, mais pas a n'importe quel prix!" (roughly translating to, "I am an omnivore, but with a standard.")

The menu at Le Coq Rico is dedicated to the highest quality, responsibly raised, and genetically exceptional whole birds presented as shared meals for up to 4 people, including multiple breeds of chicken, rooster, guinea fowl, and duck.

Chef Westermann claims his adventure for the future is working hand in hand with farmers to reintroduce the public to the richness of ancient poultry breeds and sharing his passion for cooking poultry in French, European, and American regions.

Recipes
 Young Hen in a Baeckeoffe
 Recipe of Young Fatted Hen Terrine with Fennel & Foie Gras
 Recipe of Frog's Legs with Schniederspaetle
 Daube of Warm Vegetables with a Salad of White Haricots with Aged Vinegar
 Beer Brioche

Books
 Le Coq Rico, La Cuisine des Belles Volailles by Antoine Westermann, photos by Marie-Pierre Morel, illustrations by Shane & Christophe Meyer - Editions Marabout, 2013 
 La Cuisine de Monsieur Momo by Maurice Joyant and Henri de Toulouse-Lautrec, recipes of Antoine Westermann - Editions Menu Fretin, 2011 
 Cuisine-moi des Étoiles by Jean Orizet and Antoine Westermann - Editions Le Cherche midi, 2009 
 La Cuisine Ménagère d'un Grand Chef by Antoine Westermann - Editions Minerva, 1999 
 L'Alsace des Saveurs Retrouvées by Antoine Westermann - Editions Albin Michel, 1998 

Chefs books
Burger de Chefs by Thérèse Rocher photos by Delphine Amar-Constantini - Éditions Larousse pages 192 to 194: Poultry Burger and Strass'Burger, 2014 
 Le Nouvel Art Culinaire Français - Editions Flammarion, 2012 
 Les 100 Mots de la Gastronomie by Alain Bauer & Laurent Plantier - Editions Que sais-je?, 2010 
 Trois Étoiles au Michelin: Une Histoire de la Haute Gastronomie Française et Européenne by Jean-François Mesplède, preface by Alain Ducasse - Editions Gründ, 2004  
 La Haute Cuisine Française, les Recettes Emblématiques des Grands Chefs du Monde by Nicolas de Rabaudy, preface by Antoine Westermann, illustrations of Sandrine Courau and Reno Marca - Editions Minerva, 2001

References

External links
 
 Official Twitter
 Official Facebook Le Coq Rico
 The French Wikipedia of Antoine Westermann

1946 births
French chefs
French cuisine
Living people
Head chefs of Michelin starred restaurants